The Texas Thunder were a professional baseball team. The Thunder were a member of the United League Baseball, an independent professional league, which is not affiliated with Major League Baseball or Minor League Baseball. 

The team made its debut as the Coastal Bend Thunder in the United League Baseball in 2009, after the dissolution of the Coastal Bend Aviators of the American Association the previous year. The team played in Fairgrounds Field in Robstown, Texas. The team had financial difficulties and was locked out of their stadium by the city in December 2010 due to unpaid rent, utilities and stadium maintenance costs.

For the following season, the team was adopted by McAllen, Texas and changed its name to the McAllen Thunder. They joined the new North American League and shared Edinburg Stadium with the Edinburg Roadrunners, who were owned by the same people.

In 2013, after the dissolution of the North American League, the team rejoined the ULB, as a true travel team without a home stadium, known as the Texas Thunder. The team was dissolved during the season.

References

External links
 Official website

North American League teams
United League Baseball teams
Professional baseball teams in Texas
McAllen, Texas
Sports in the Rio Grande Valley
2009 establishments in Texas
Baseball teams established in 2009
Defunct independent baseball league teams
2013 disestablishments in Texas
Baseball teams disestablished in 2013
Defunct baseball teams in Texas